Nepalis in Thailand comprise migrants from Nepal to Thailand, including expatriates and permanent residents, as well as their locally born descendants.

Overview
Most Nepalis in Thailand mainly live in Bangkok, Chiang Mai and in the popular resort towns of Phuket, Pattaya and Chaweng Beach on Ko Samui in the Gulf of Thailand. Around 4,000 to 5,000 Nepalis work in Thailand, according to the Nepalese embassy in Bangkok. They tend to engage in specific types of work such as clerks in tailor shops, as ready-made garment makers, and as ‘trinket-wallahs’ at the beach resorts. A few of them also run small restaurants. Not all the Nepalis in Thailand are legal residents and some have been hiding and surviving in Thailand as displaced persons on odd-jobs such as shop-boys and waiters.

The number of Nepalis receiving Thailand visas in the first eight months of 2009 has increased by 30 percent as compared to the figures of same period in the previous year. More than three dozen Nepali drug traffickers are serving long term jail sentences in Thai prisons including life imprisonment.

References

Ethnic groups in Thailand
Thailand
Thailand